Louis-Alexandre Martin (7 April 1838 – 15 October 1913) was a Swiss politician and President of the Swiss National Council (1903/1904).

Further reading

External links 
 
 

Members of the National Council (Switzerland)
Presidents of the National Council (Switzerland)
1838 births
1913 deaths